Lyudmila Yuryevna Bogdanova (born 12 August 1983 in Chişinău, Moldavian SSR) is a Russian judoka, who played for the extra lightweight category. She is a multiple-time Russian judo champion, and a two-time gold medalist for the 52 kg division at the European Junior Judo Championships (2003 in Yerevan, Armenia and 2005 in Kiev, Ukraine). She also achieved three top-five finishes in the women's 48 kg class at the European Judo Championships (2008 in Lisbon, Portugal, 2010 in Vienna, Austria, and 2011 in Istanbul, Turkey).

Career 
Bogdanova represented Russia at the 2008 Summer Olympics in Beijing, where she competed for the women's 48 kg class. She received a bye for the second preliminary round, before losing out by a yuko and a non-combativity (P29) to Cuba's Yanet Bermoy. Because her opponent advanced further into the final, Bogdanova offered another shot for the bronze medal by defeating Ecuador's Glenda Miranda, Germany's Michaela Baschin, and Portugal's Ana Hormigo in the repechage rounds. She progressed to the bronze medal match, but narrowly lost the medal to Japanese judoka and five-time Olympian Ryoko Tani, who successfully scored an ippon and an uchi mata (inner thigh throw), at two minutes and twenty-seven seconds.

References

External links
 
 
 
 NBC 2008 Olympics profile

Russian female judoka
Living people
Olympic judoka of Russia
Judoka at the 2008 Summer Olympics
Sportspeople from Chișinău
1983 births